Katherine Barker may refer to:

 Katherine Barker, a play by Jean Audureau
 Katherine Barker, actress in the 1963 theatrical adaptation The Wars of the Roses
 Katherine 'Ma' Barker, character in the film Ma Barker's Killer Brood

See also
 Catherine Barker, British figure skater
 Katharine Barker (disambiguation)
 Kate Barker (disambiguation)
 Kathy Barker (born 1953), American scientist and science fiction writer

Barker, Katherine